Billabong High International School, Juhu is an IGCSE board school in Juhu, Mumbai. The school operates from pre-primary to 10th grade level. It conducts extra-curricular activities twice a week.

High schools and secondary schools in Mumbai
International schools in Mumbai